This is a list of schools with dedicated or teaching programs in diplomacy

Africa

Cameroon 

 University of Yaoundé: International Relations Institute of Cameroon located in Yaoundé
 University of Yaounde 2 : International relations and strategic studies

Egypt

 Cairo University: Faculty of Economics and Political Science located in Giza
 Mansoura University:  located in Mansoura
 American University in Cairo: Political Science Department and the School of Global Affairs and Public Policy located in Cairo
 Helwan University: Faculty of Commerce and Business Administration Department of International Relations located in Cairo
 Pharos University in Alexandria: Faculty of Legal Studies and International Relations ions located in Alexandria
 British University in Cairo: Political Science Department located in Cairo
 Future University: Political Science Department located in Cairo

Ghana

 Ridgeway School of Diplomacy: located in Accra Ghana.
 University of Ghana: Legon Center for International Affairs and Diplomacy located in Accra

Kenya

 United States International University: school of humanities and social sciences, Bachelor of Arts in international relations
 University of Nairobi: Institute of Diplomacy and International Studies located in Nairobi
 Maseno University: School of Development and Strategic Studies, Bachelor of Arts in International Relations and Diplomacy, with IT located in Kisumu

Liberia

 University of Liberia: Ibrahim B. Babangida Graduate School of International Relations located in Monrovia

Morocco

 Al Akhawayn University: School of Humanities and Social Sciences located in Ifrane

Mozambique 

 Higher Institute of International Relations: Located in Maputo, www.isri.co.mz

South Africa

 Rhodes University: Faculty of Humanities located in Grahamstown
 Stellenbosch University: Faculty of Arts and Social Sciences located in Stellenbosch
 University of Cape Town: Faculty of Humanities located in Cape Town
 University of KwaZulu-Natal: School of Politics located in Pietermaritzburg
 University of Pretoria: Faculty of Humanities located in Pretoria
 University of the Witwatersrand: School of Social Sciences located in Johannesburg

Sudan

 University of Khartoum: Faculty of Economic and Social Studies located in Khartoum

Asia

Bangladesh 

 Bangladesh University of Professionals, Dhaka
 Bangabandhu Sheikh Mujibur Rahman Science and Technology University Gopalganj, Dhaka
 Jahangirnagar University, established 1999, Savar, Dhaka, founder: Ataur Rahman Khan
 University of Chittagong
 University of Dhaka established the first department of international relations in South Asia, in the academic year 1947–48.
 University of Rajshahi has Bangladesh's second oldest department of international relations, established in 1998.

China

 China Foreign Affairs University (formerly Foreign Affairs College)
 City University of Hong Kong
 Fudan University - School of International and Public Affairs
 Hopkins-Nanjing Center
 Peking University - Department of International Relations
 Renmin University - Department of International Relations
 Shanghai International Studies University
 Tsinghua University - Department of International Relations
 University of International Relations
 Guangdong University of Foreign Studies
 Beijing International Studies University
 Sichuan International Studies University
 Xi'an International Studies University
 Dalian University of Foreign Languages

Nepal 
 Tribhuvan University, Master's Programme in International Relations and Diplomacy (MIRD)
 Mid-Western University

India

 Symbiosis School of International Studies,(Symbiosis International University) Pune
 Jamia Millia Islamia, MMAJ Academy of International Studies
 Aligarh Muslim University, Faculty of International Studies
 Annamalai University, Tamil Nadu
 Central University of Gujarat
Central University of South Bihar
 Central University of Jharkhand Center For International Relations
 Central University of Punjab
 Centre for International Relations, Islamic University of Science and Technology, Jammu and Kashmir. 
 Jadavpur University
 Jawaharlal Nehru University, School of International Studies
 Jindal School of International Affairs, National Capital Region of Delhi
 Mahatma Gandhi University
 Manipal University
 Pondicherry University
 School of Global Studies, Department of International Relations, Central University of Kerala, Kasargod
 School of Liberal Studies, Pandit Deendayal Petroleum University
 Sikkim University (central university), Sikkim
 South Asian University, New Delhi
 Stella Maris College, Chennai, Tamil Nadu
 Symbiosis School for Liberal Arts, (Symbiosis International University) Pune
 University of Madras, School of Politics and International Studies

 Christ University Bengaluru, M.A. International Studies
 M.A. in International Relations, Maharaja's College, Mysore
University of Rajasthan - Main Website
 S.S. Jain Subodh P.G. (Autonomous) College Jaipur

Indonesia

 Airlangga University, Faculty of Politics and Social Science Studies
 Andalas University, Faculty of Politics and Social Science Studies
 Bakrie university, Faculty of Economics and Social Sciences
 Bina Nusantara University, Faculty of Humanities
 Diponegoro University, Faculty of Political and Social Sciences
 Gadjah Mada University, Faculty of Political and Social Science Studies
 Hasanuddin University, Faculty of social sciences
 Jenderal Ahmad Yani University, Faculty of Politics and Social Sciences
 Jenderal Soedirman University, Faculty of Politics and Social Science Studies
 Muhammadiyah University of Yogyakarta, Faculty of Political and Social Science Studies
 Mulawarman University, Faculty of politics and social science studies
 National Development University "Veteran" Yogyakarta, Faculty of Social and Political Sciences
 Padjajaran University, Faculty of Politics and Social Science
 Parahyangan Catholic University, Faculty of Politics and Social Science Studies
 Paramadina University, Faculty of Philosophy and Civilization
 Pasundan University, Faculty of Politics and Social Science Studies
 Pelita Harapan University, Faculty of Social and Political Sciences Studies
 Pertamina University, Faculty of Communication and Diplomacy
 President University, Faculty of Business Administration and International Relations
 Respati University of Yogyakarta, Faculty of Social Sciences and Economics
 State Islamic University, Syarif Hidayatullah, Faculty of Social and Political Sciences
 University of Indonesia, Faculty of Politics and Social Science Studies
 University of Jember, Faculty of Political and Social Science Studies

 Udayana University, Faculty of Social and Political Sciences

Japan

 Asia University
 International Christian University
 International University of Japan
 National Graduate Institute for Policy Studies
 Nihon University
 Ritsumeikan University
 University of Tsukuba

Malaysia

 International Islamic University Malaysia, PhD in Political Science
 National University of Malaysia, Institute for Malaysian and International Studies
 National University of Malaysia, School of History, Politics and Strategic Studies
 University of Malaya, Department of International and Strategyc Studies
 Universiti Malaysia Sabah, School of Social Science
 Universiti Utara Malaysia, Kedah, School of International Studies

 Monash University Malaysia, School of Arts and Social Sciences

Pakistan

 Department of International Relations, Bahria University, Islamabad
 Institute of Business Management Karachi School of International Relations
 International Islamic University, Islamabad Department of International Relations
 Iqra University
 Kinnaird College Department of International Relations
 Lahore College for Women University, Lahore Department of International Relations
 National Defence University, Islamabad Department of International Relations, Faculty of Contemporary Studies
 National University of Modern Languages Department of International relations
 Preston University Islamabad
 Quaid-i-Azam University, Islamabad, School of Politics and International Relations
 University of Karachi Department of International Relations and Political Science
 University of Peshawar Department of International relations

Philippines

 Ateneo de Davao University
 Ateneo School of Social Sciences and Ateneo School of Government
 Cavite State University
 Centro Escolar University
 College of the Holy Spirit
 De La Salle – College of Saint Benilde – School of Multidisciplinary Studies
 De La Salle University College of Liberal Arts
 Far Eastern University
 Liceo de Cagayan University
 Lyceum of the Philippines University – College of International Relations (AB Foreign Service major in Diplomacy/International Trade)
 Manuel L. Quezon University
 Mindanao State University – Main Campus, Marawi City
 Miriam College
 New Era University
 Philippine Women's University
 RC Al-Khwarizmi International College – College of Diplomacy and International Relations, Marawi City
 University of Asia and the Pacific-Political Economy Program with Specialization in International Relations and Development
 University of Manila – Department of Foreign Service
 University of St. La Salle
 University of San Agustin
 University of San Jose – Recoletos
 University of Santo Tomas Faculty of Arts and Letters
 University of Southern Mindanao
 University of the East – College of Arts and Science
 University of the Philippines College of Social Sciences and Philosophy
 Xavier University – Ateneo de Cagayan

Singapore

 Lee Kuan Yew School of Public Policy, National University of Singapore
 S. Rajaratnam School of International Studies, Nanyang Technological University

South Korea

 Ewha Womans University
 Hankuk University of Foreign Studies
 Korea University
 Kyunghee University

 Sogang University
 Yonsei University

Sri Lanka

 Bandaranaike International Diplomatic Training Institute
 Lakshman Kadirgamar Institute of International Relations and Strategic Studies

Taiwan

 Department of Political Science, National Taiwan University
 College of International Affairs, National Chengchi University
 Institute of Political Science, National Sun Yat-sen University
 Graduate Institute of International Politics, National Chung Hsing University
 Institute of Strategy and International Affairs, National Chung Cheng University
 Graduate School of International Affairs, Ming Chuan University
 Graduate Institute of International Affairs and Strategic Studies, Tamkang University

Tajikistan

 Tajik National University
 Russian-Tajik Slavonic University
 Lomonosov Moscow State University branch
 University of Central Asia
 Tajikistan Humanitarian International University
 Technological University of Tajikistan

Thailand

Mahidol University (Department of International Relations and Global Affairs)
 College of Politics and Governance, Mahasarakham University (The Department of International Relations)
 Faculty of Political Science, Chulalongkorn University (The Department of International Relations)
 International College, Khonkaen University (The Department of International Relations)
 Faculty of Political Science, Ramkhamheang University (The Department of International Relations)
 Faculty of Political Science, Thammasat University (The Department of International Relations)
 Kasetsart University
 Srinakharinwirot University

Turkmenistan

 Institute of International Relations
 International University of Humanities and Development

Vietnam

 Diplomatic Academy of Vietnam
 University of Social Sciences and Humanities - Vietnam National University
 Hanoi University
 Ho Chi Minh City University of Foreign Languages and Information Technology (HUFLIT)
 Ho Chi Minh City University of Social Sciences and Humanities

 University of Economy and Finance- UEF

Europe

Austria

 Diplomatic Academy of Vienna (DA)

Belgium

 College of Europe, Bruges
 Saint-Louis University, Brussels, Brussels
 UCLouvain, Louvain-la-Neuve
 UCLouvain FUCaM Mons, Mons
 University of Liège, Liège
 University of Antwerp, Antwerp
 Vesalius College, Brussels
 KU Leuven, Leuven

Belarus

 Belarusian State University, Minsk

Bosnia and Herzegovina

 Faculty of Political Science, University of Sarajevo
 Faculty of Arts and Social Sciences, International University of Sarajevo
 Faculty of Political Science, University of Banja Luka

Bulgaria

 Sofia University, Sofia
 University of National and World Economy, Sofia
 South-West University "Neofit Rilski", Blagoevgrad

Croatia

 Dubrovnik International University, Dubrovnik,
 University College of International Relations and Diplomacy Dag Hammarskjöld, Zagreb,

Czech Republic

 Charles University, Prague
 Masaryk University, Brno
 Metropolitan University Prague
 Palacky University, Olomouc
 University of Economics, Prague

Denmark

 Aarhus University

Estonia

 Tallinn University
 Tallinn University of Technology
 University of Tartu

France

 American Graduate School in Paris (AGS), Paris
 Centre d'Etudes Diplomatiques et Stratégiques (CEDS), Paris
 Écoles des Hautes Études Internationales et Politiques,(HEI-HEP) Paris
 École Nationale d'Administration (ÉNA), Strasbourg
 , (IRIS) Paris.
 Institut libre d'étude des relations internationales,(ILERI), Paris
 Institute of Higher International Studies, Paris
 Sciences Po Paris (formally known as Institut d'Études Politiques de Paris), Paris, and in particular its specific department, the Paris School of International Affairs
 Institut d'Etudes Politiques de Lyon (Sciences Po Lyon)
 Sciences Po Strasbourg
 Sciences Po Lille
 Sciences Po Grenoble
 Université Lyon 3
 Schiller International University (SIU), Paris
 The American University of Paris (AUP), Paris

Germany

 Hochschule Rhein-Waal, Cleves
 Ostbayerische Technische Hochschule Regensburg (OTH), Regensburg
 School of International Studies of the Dresden University of Technology
 Schiller International University (SIU), Heidelberg
 Universität Erfurt, Erfurt

Hungary

 Andrássy Gyula German Language University of Budapest, Budapest
 Central European University (CEU), Budapest
 Corvinus University of Budapest, Budapest
 Eötvös Loránd University, Budapest
 University of Szeged, Szeged

Italy

 Bologna Center of the Johns Hopkins University Paul H. Nitze School of Advanced International Studies (SAIS)
 Ca' Foscari University of Venice – School of International Relations
 European University Institute (EUI), Florence
 Institute for International Political Studies (ISPI), Milan
 Italian Society for International Organizations (SIOI), Rome
 Luiss School of Government, Rome
 NATO Defense College (NDC), Rome
 St. John's University MA in Government and Politics - International Affairs, Rome
 United Nations System Staff College (UNSSC), Turin
 University of Bologna – School of Political Science "R. Ruffilli", Forlì Campus
 University of Florence – School of Political Science "Cesare Alfieri"
 University of Milan – School of Political Science
 University of Padua – School of Political Science
 University of Pavia – School of Political Science
 University of Salento – Faculty of Education, Political and Social sciences
 University of Trieste – School of International and Diplomatic Studies (SID), Gorizia Campus
 University of Trento – School of International Studies

Lithuania

 Vilnius University Institute of International Relations and Political Science (TSPMI), Vilnius
 Vytautas Magnus University Faculty of Political Science and Diplomacy (PMDF), Kaunas

The Netherlands

 University of Groningen, Groningen
 University of Leiden, Leiden
 Netherlands Institute of International Relations Clingendael, The Hague

Poland 

 College of Europe, Natolin Campus
 Collegium Civitas
 Maria Curie-Skłodowska University
 Jagiellonian University 
 University of Warsaw
 University of Wrocław
 Lazarski University

Portugal 

 Catholic University of Portugal, Lisbon 
- Institute of Political Studies 
 University of Coimbra, Coimbra
- Faculty of Economics
 University of Évora, Évora
- School of Social Sciences 
 University of Lisbon, Lisbon
- School of Social and Political Sciences 
 University of Porto, Porto
- Faculty of Arts and Humanities
 New University of Lisbon, Lisbon 
- Faculty of Social and Human Sciences 
 University of Minho, Braga
 University of Beira Interior, Covilhã 
 Autonomous University of Lisbon, Lisbon
 Lusíada University, Lisbon
 Lusíada University of Porto, Porto
 Lusophone University of Humanities and Technologies, Lisbon
 Portucalense University Infante D. Henrique, Porto 
 Fernando Pessoa University, Porto

Russia

 Diplomatic Academy of the Ministry of Foreign Affairs of the Russian Federation
 Far Eastern Federal University
 Moscow State Institute of International Relations
 Moscow State Linguistic University
 N. I. Lobachevsky State University of Nizhny Novgorod
 People's Friendship University of Russia
 Saint Petersburg State University, School of International Relations
 Tomsk State University, Department of International Relations

Serbia

 Academy of Diplomacy and Security, Belgrade
 University of Belgrade, Faculty of Political Sciences located in Belgrade

Slovakia

 Faculty of International Relations, University of Economics in Bratislava, Bratislava
 Matej Bel School of Political Sciences and International Relations, Banská Bystrica

Slovenia

 Faculty of Social Sciences: Ljubljana

Spain

 Diplomatic School of Spain, Madrid
 IE School of International Relations, Madrid
 Institut Barcelona d'Estudis Internacionals, Barcelona
 Schiller International University (SIU), Madrid
 Universidad de Navarra, Pamplona
 Universidad Rey Juan Carlos, Madrid
 Universidad Europea, Madrid & Valencia
 Universidad Loyola de Andalucía, Andalucía
 Universidad de Deusto, Bilbao & San Sebastián

Switzerland

 Geneva School of Diplomacy and International Relations
 Graduate Institute of International and Development Studies (IHEID), Geneva
 University of Geneva
 University of St. Gallen
 Webster University Geneva

Turkey

 Ankara University 
 Bilkent University 
 Galatasaray University
 Istanbul Bilgi University
 Koç University
 Middle East Technical University: Department of International Relations located in Ankara
 Özyeğin University

United Kingdom 

 Aberystwyth University
Durham University, School of Government and International Affairs
 Exeter University
 Goldsmiths, University of London
 Keele University
 Lancaster University
 London School of Economics and Political Science
 Loughborough University
 Nottingham Trent University
 Oxford University
 Richmond, The American International University in London
 Royal Holloway College
 Schiller International University (SIU), London
 School of Oriental and African Studies (SOAS)
 Swansea University
 University of Aberdeen
 University of Birmingham
 University of Bristol
 University of Cambridge
 University of Edinburgh
 University of Derby
 University of East Anglia
 University of Essex
 University of Kent
 University of Leeds
 University of Leicester
 University of London
 University of Manchester
 University of Northampton
 University of Plymouth
 University of Portsmouth
 University of St. Andrews
 University of Sussex
 University of York
 University of Warwick
 University of Westminster

 Nottingham Trent University
 London Metropolitan University
 Oxford Brookes University

Americas

Argentina 

 Pontificia Universidad Católica Argentina located in Buenos Aires
 Universidad Nacional de San Martín located in San Martín, Buenos Aires
 Universidad del Salvador located in Buenos Aires

Brazil

Bahia 
 Universidade Salvador (UNIFACS) in Salvador

Distrito Federal
 Institute of International Relations at University of Brasília in Brasília
 Rio Branco Institute (IRBr) in Brasília
Uniprojeção Brasilia 
 Universidade Católica de Brasília (UCB) in Brasília

Goiás
 Pontifícia Universidade Católica de Goiás (PUC-Goiás) in Goiânia

Mato Grosso do Sul
 Universidade Federal da Grande Dourados (UFGD) in Dourados

Minas Gerais
 Pontifícia Universidade Católica de Minas Gerais (PUC-MG) in Belo Horizonte
 Universidade Federal de Uberlândia (UFU) in Uberlândia

Paraíba
 Centro de Ciências Biológicas e Sociais Applicadas (CCBSA) at State University of Paraíba (UEPB) in João Pessoa
 Federal University of Paraíba (UFPB) in João Pessoa

Pernambuco
 Faculdade Damas da Instrução Cristã (FADIC) in Recife

Rio de Janeiro

 Instituto Brasileiro de Mercado de Capitais (Ibmec) in Rio de Janeiro
 Universidade Cândido Mendes (UCAM) in Rio de Janeiro
 Universidade Estácio de Sá (Estácio, S.A.) in Rio de Janeiro
 Centro Federal de Educação Tecnológica (CEFET-RJ) in Rio de Janeiro
 Centro Universitário IBMR (IBMR) in Rio de Janeiro
 Pontifícia Universidade Católica do Rio de Janeiro (PUC-Rio) in Rio de Janeiro
 Universidade Federal Rural do Rio de Janeiro (UFRRJ) in Seropédica
 Universidade Federal do Rio de Janeiro (UFRJ) in Rio de Janeiro
 Universidade do Estado do Rio de Janeiro (UERJ) in Rio de Janeiro

Rio Grande do Sul

 Núcleo PRISMA - International Relations Research Center at Universidade Federal de Santa Maria (UFSM) in Santa Maria
 Mercosur's Integration Center at Universidade Federal de Pelotas (UFPEL) in Pelotas
 Universidade Federal do Rio Grande do Sul in Porto Alegre
 Universidade La Salle (Unilasalle) in Canoas
 Universidade Federal do Rio Grande (FURG) in Santa Vitória do Palmar

Roraima
 Universidade Federal de Roraima (UFRR) in Boa Vista

Santa Catarina
 Universidade do Sul de Santa Catarina (UNISUL) in Florianópolis
 Centro Universitário Curitiba (UniCuritiba) in Curitiba
 Universidade Federal de Santa Catarina (UFSC) in Florianópolis
 Universidade do Vale do Itajaí (UNIVALI) in Itajaí

São Paulo

 Centro Universitário Senac in São Paulo
 Universidade Federal do ABC (UFABC) in Santo André
 Fundação Armando Alvares Penteado (FAAP) in São Paulo
 Fundação Escola de Comércio Álvares Penteado (FECAP) in São Paulo
 Universidade Estadual Paulista (UNESP) in Franca and Marília
 Institute of International Relations and Group of International Conjuncture Analysis at University of São Paulo (USP) in São Paulo
 Pontifícia Universidade Católica de São Paulo (PUC-SP) in São Paulo
 Faculdades Metropolitanas Unidas (FMU) in São Paulo
 Escola Superior de Propaganda e Marketing (ESPM) in São Paulo
 Faculdades Integradas Rio Branco in São Paulo
 Escola Paulista de Política, Economia e Negócios at Universidade Federal de São Paulo (UNIFESP) in Osasco
 Centro de Relações Internacionais at Faculdades Campinas (FACAMP) in Campinas

Sergipe
 Universidade Federal de Sergipe (UFS) in Aracaju

Canada

Alberta

 Department of Political Science - University of Calgary: BA in International Relations

British Columbia

 Department of International Studies - University of Northern British Columbia: BA in International Studies; MA in International Studies
 Liu Institute for Global Issues - University of British Columbia: BA in International Relations
UBC Graduate School - University of British Columbia: Master's of Public Policy and Global Affairs:
 School of International Studies - Simon Fraser University: BA in International Studies; MA in International Studies

Ontario

 Balsillie School of International Affairs - University of Waterloo & Wilfrid Laurier University: MA in Global Governance; MA in International Public Policy; Ph.D. in Global Governance
 Glendon School of Public and International Affairs - Glendon College (autonomous college of York University): MA in Public International Affairs
 Graduate School of Public and International Affairs - University of Ottawa: BSocSc in Conflict Studies and Human Rights; MA in Public and International Affairs
 Department of Political Science - McMaster University: MA in International Relations; Ph.D. in International Relations
 Munk School of Global Affairs and Public Policy - University of Toronto: BA in International Relations; MA in Global Affairs
 Norman Paterson School of International Affairs - Carleton University: MA in International Affairs; Ph.D. in International Affairs
 Department of History & Department of Political Science - University of Western Ontario: BA in International Relations
 Department of Political Science - University of Windsor: BA in International Relations and Development Studies

Québec

 Institute for Advanced International Studies - Université Laval: MA in International Studies; Ph.D. in International Studies
 Centre for International Studies (CÉRIUM) - Université de Montréal: BA in International Studies; 
 The Montreal Institute of International Studies - Université du Québec à Montréal: BA in International Relations and International Law

Saskatchewan

 Department of Political Science and the International Studies - University of Regina: BA in International Studies

Colombia

 Universidad Jorge Tadeo Lozano (Faculty of International Relations) Located in Bogotá.
 Universidad Externado de Colombia Government and International Relations faculty in Colombia. Located in Bogotá, Colombia.
 Universidad Externado de Colombia (Faculty of Finance, Public Affairs and International Relations) located in Bogotá
 Pontificia Universidad Javeriana (Faculty of Social Sciences, International Relations) located in Bogotá
 Universidad del Rosario (Faculty of International Relations) Located in Bogotá
 Universidad Militar Nueva Granada (Faculty of Internacional Relations and Political Studies) located in Bogotá.

Costa Rica 

 United Nations University for Peace
 Universidad Nacional, School for International Relations

Mexico

Oaxaca
 Institute of International Relations Isidro Fabela at Universidad del Mar

Mexico City

 Centre of International Studies at El Colegio de México
 Department of International Studies at Monterrey Institute of Technology and Higher Education, Campus Ciudad de México
 Bachelor in International Relations at Universidad del Valle de Mexico
 Department of International Relations at Universidad Iberoamericana
 Bachelor in International Relations at Centro de Investigación y Docencia Económicas
 School of International Relations at Universidad Anáhuac del Norte
 International Relations Centre, at Political and Social Sciences School (CRI-FCPyS) at National Autonomous University of Mexico
 Department of International Studies Instituto Tecnológico Autónomo de México

Jalisco

 Department of International Studies (Centro Universitario de Ciencias Sociales y Humanidades) at University of Guadalajara located in Guadalajara
 Department of Asia-Pacific Studies (Centro Universitario de Ciencias Sociales y Humanidades) at University of Guadalajara located in Guadalajara
 Department of Latin American Studies (Centro Universitario de Ciencias Sociales y Humanidades) at University of Guadalajara located in Guadalajara
 Division of Social Sciences and Humanities at Monterrey Institute of Technology and Higher Education, Campus Guadalajara
 Bachelor in International Relations at Western Institute of Technology and Higher Education
 Bachelor in International Relations at Universidad Autónoma de Guadalajara
 Bachelor in International Relations at Universidad del Valle de Mexico

Nuevo León

 Department of International Relations and Political Science at Monterrey Institute of Technology and Higher Education, Campus Monterrey
 Faculty of Political Science and Public Administration at Universidad Autónoma de Nuevo León

Puebla

 Department of International Relations and Political Science (DRICP) at Universidad de las Américas Puebla
 Faculty of Law and Social Sciences at Autonomous University of Puebla

Panamá 

 Universidad de Panamá located in Panama City

Perú

 Pontificia Universidad Católica del Perú located in Lima
 Academia Diplomática del Perú located in Lima
 Universidad San Ignacio de Loyola located in Lima

Uruguay

 Universidad de la Republica

United States

Venezuela

 Universidad Central de Venezuela, School of International Studies located in Caracas
 Universidad Santa María:, School of International Studies located in Caracas

Middle East

Iran

 School of International Relations

Iraq

 American University of Iraq located in Sulaymaniyah
 University of Baghdad: College of Political Sciences located in Baghdad
 University of Mosul: College of Political Sciences located in Mosul

Israel 

 Jerusalem Faculty of Political Science
 Haifa Diplomatic University

Jordan

 University of Jordan: Faculty of International Studies located in Amman

Kuwait

 American University of Kuwait located in Kuwait City

Lebanon

 Lebanese American University: School of Arts and Sciences  located in Beirut and Byblos
 Notre Dame University - Louaize: Faculty of Political Science, Public Administration & Diplomacy located in Zouk Mosbeh
 University of Balamand: Faculty of Arts and Social Sciences located in El-Koura

Palestine 

 Al-Quds University: The Al Quds Bard Honors College located in Jerusalem

Qatar

 Qatar University: College of Arts and Sciences located in Doha
 Georgetown University School of Foreign Service in Qatar located in Doha

Syria

 University of Kalamoon: Faculty of Diplomatic Sciences and International Relations located in Damascus

United Arab Emirates

 American University of Sharjah: College of Arts and Sciences located in Sharjah
 Paris-Sorbonne University Abu Dhabi located in Abu Dhabi
 Zayed University: College of Arts and Sciences  located in Abu Dhabi and Dubai
 University of Sharjah: College of Arts, Humanities and Social Sciences.
American University Of Dubai

Oceania

Australia

Australian Capital Territory

 Australian National University: School of Politics and International Relations located in Canberra
 Australian National University: Asia-Pacific School of Diplomacy located in Canberra
 Australian National University: ANU College of Asia and the Pacific located in Canberra
 Australian National University: ANU Centre for Arab and Islamic Studies located in Canberra

New South Wales

 Macquarie University: Macquarie University Faculty of Arts located in Sydney
 University of New South Wales: School of Social Sciences and International Studies located in Sydney
 University of Sydney: School of Social and Political Sciences located in Sydney

Queensland

 University of Queensland: Faculty of Social and Behavioural Sciences located in Brisbane

Tasmania

 University of Tasmania: School of Government located in Hobart

Victoria

 La Trobe University: School of Social Sciences located in Melbourne
 Monash University: Monash University Faculty of Arts located in Melbourne
 RMIT University: School of Global, Urban and Social Studies located in Melbourne
 University of Melbourne: School of Social and Political Sciences located in Melbourne

South Australia

 University of Adelaide: Faculty of Humanities & Social Science located in Adelaide

Western Australia

 University of Western Australia: School of Social and Cultural Studies located in Perth

New Zealand

 University of Auckland: University of Auckland Faculty of Arts located in Auckland
 University of Canterbury: School of Social and Political Sciences located in Christchurch
 Victoria University of Wellington, located in the country's capital, Wellington

See also

 Association of Professional Schools of International Affairs

References

International relations